José Perches Enríquez or José Perches (1883–1939) was a Mexican musician and composer.

He was born in the city of Chihuahua.  He was a skilled pianist and composer, whose musical works included "Secreto eterno", "Vals Capricho", and the dance tune "Tono".

He was granted a pension by Colonel Miguel, governor of the state of Chihuahua, so that he could continue his studies in Mexico City, and devote himself to education and giving concerts.

References 

1883 births
1939 deaths